Pleasant View, also known as Trabue's Tavern, is a historic plantation house located near Midlothian, Chesterfield County, Virginia.  The original section was built about 1730, and consists of two parts—an early -story western wing with a lean-to and a later two-story eastern wing with a one-story rear lean-to.  Both sections are frame structures with gable roofs.  Also on the property are several contributing buildings: an outhouse, well house, dairy, smokehouse, two kitchen buildings, schoolhouse, and family cemetery. Macon Trabue installed a wrought iron fence around the cemetery in the mid-nineteenth century.

The property was owned by the Trabue family, an ethnic French Huguenot family who were among the principal mine-owners in the town. They used the house as an inn patronized by travelers and miners alike.

The estate was listed on the National Register of Historic Places in 1975.

References

Plantation houses in Virginia
Houses on the National Register of Historic Places in Virginia
Houses completed in 1730
Houses in Chesterfield County, Virginia
National Register of Historic Places in Chesterfield County, Virginia